Stanley Park is a public park in Vancouver, British Columbia, Canada.

Stanley Park may also refer to:

Arts and entertainment
 Stanley Park (novel), by Timothy Taylor, 2001
 Stanley Park (TV series), a 2010 drama pilot episode for BBC Three

Places

Canada
Stanley Park (neighbourhood), in Vancouver, British Columbia, Canada
Parkhill/Stanley Park, Calgary, Alberta, Canada

United Kingdom
Stanley Park, Blackpool, England
Stanley Park, Liverpool, England
Stanley Park Stadium (proposed)
Stanley Park railway station (proposed)
Stanley Park, in Selsley, Gloucestershire, England

United States
Stanley Park (Westfield, Massachusetts)